Abdullah ibn Muhammad ibn Ubaid ibn sufyan ibn Abi al-Dunya, Abu bakar, Baghdadi, known by his epithet of Ibn Abi al-Dunya (AH 207/8–281, 823–894 CE) was a Muslim scholar. During his lifetime, he served as a tutor to the Abbasid caliphs, al-Mu'tadid (861–902) and his son, al-Muktafi (878–908).

Ibn Abi al-Dunya's treatise on music, Dhamm al-malālī ('Condemnation of the malāhī'), is believed by Amnon Shiloah (1924–2014) to have been the first systematic attack on music from Islamic scholarship, becoming 'a model for all subsequent texts on the subject'. His understanding of malāhī, as constituting not just "instruments of diversion" but also musics forbidden and for the purposes of amusement only, was an interpretation that 'guided all subsequent authors who dealt with the question of the lawfulness of music'.

Works 

 A Maqtal al-Husayn retelling the story of the battle of Karbala
 "Al-sabq wa al-ramī" on Furusiyya martial
 Dhamm al-malālī - An essay of strong opposition to music.
Kitab al-Manam
 Sifat al-nar, discusses hellfire and the punishments unbelievers and sinners will face.

See also 

 Islamic Golden Age
 Abbasid Caliphate
 Islamic music

References

894 deaths
Year of birth unknown
Year of birth uncertain
9th-century people from the Abbasid Caliphate
Islamic asceticism